The Treaty of Żurawno was signed on 17 October 1676 in the town of Żurawno (or İzvança, as it was called during the Ottoman occupation of Podolia), in the aftermath of the Battle of Żurawno.

The treaty, signed by the Polish–Lithuanian Commonwealth and the Ottoman Empire, ended the second phase of the Polish–Ottoman War (1672–76). It revised the 1672 Treaty of Buchach, and was more favorable to the Commonwealth, which no longer had to pay tribute, and regained about one third of the Ukrainian territories lost in the Buchach treaty. It also stipulated that the Lipka Tatars were to be given a free individual choice of whether they wanted to serve the Ottoman Empire or the Polish-Lithuanian Commonwealth.

In order to ratify the treaty, the Commonwealth sent to Istanbul Jan Gninski, the voivode of Chelmno Voivodeship. He stayed there in 1677-1678, but in the meantime, Polish Sejm refused to ratify the document. Soon afterwards, the Great Turkish War broke out. After the Treaty of Karlowitz, Podolia returned to Poland.

References 

Zurawno
Zurawno
Zurawno
1676 treaties
1676 in the Polish–Lithuanian Commonwealth
1676 in the Ottoman Empire